French-led forces captured Mexico City on 10 June 1863. 
It was part of the Second French intervention in Mexico.

History
With the French victory at the Siege of Puebla, the position of the Mexican Republic government was untenable and Juarez decided to abandon the capital and continue the war through guerrilla warfare.

As soon as the federal government left the capital, General Bruno Martinez, commander of the garrison of the town, issued a manifesto in favor of intervention, recognizing French commanding general Élie Frédéric Forey as the highest authority in Mexico. 

On June 10, the bulk of the French army entered Mexico City under the direct command of General Forey, and captured it for the Second French Empire. Soon after, the French established a puppet state in the form of emperor Maximilian. The war continued however as French forces continued to secure the country and as Mexican guerillas continued to harass the invaders.

See also

References

1863 in Mexico
Battles of the Second French intervention in Mexico
Capture of Mexico City (1863)
19th century in Mexico City
June 1863 events